is a district located in Ishikawa Prefecture, Japan.

As of 2003 population data but following the merger forming the city of Nomi, the district has an estimated population of 5,387 and a density of 364.97 persons per km2. The total area is 14.76 km2.

Towns and villages
The district has one town:

 Kawakita

History

Recent mergers
 On February 1, 2005 - The towns of Neagari, Tatsunokuchi, and Terai were merged to form the city of Nomi.

Districts in Ishikawa Prefecture